Carla Vizzotti (born 1 June 1972) is an Argentine physician specialized in vaccine-preventable diseases. She was the Secretary of Health Access and Vice Minister of Health in Argentina's Health Ministry, working under Minister Ginés González García, until February 2021. She has been Minister of Health since 20 February 2021, following González García's resignation.

Early life and career
Vizzotti was born on 1 June 1972 in Buenos Aires, daughter of a gastroenterologist. She studied medicine at the Universidad del Salvador, graduating in 1997. She specialized in internal medicine at the University of Buenos Aires. She founded, and presides over, the Sociedad Argentina de Vacunología y Epidemiología ("Argentine Society of Vaccinology and Epidemiology"; SAVE), and has also worked at the Fundación Huésped, an NGO created to respond to HIV/AIDS.

From 2007 to 2016, during the successive administrations of President Cristina Fernández de Kirchner, she headed the Health Ministry's National Directorate for the Control of Vaccine-preventable Diseases (DINACEI). During her administration, she headed the National Immunization Plan and oversaw the extension of the existing immunization registry to include 19 free and mandatory vaccines.

Political career

Secretary of Health Access

On 19 December 2019, Vizzotti was appointed to the newly established Secretariat of Health Access by Health Minister Ginés González García, as part of the administration of recently elected president Alberto Fernández.

In 2020 Vizzotti became one of the most visible public officials in the government's response to the COVID-19 pandemic. She has been tasked with giving the daily morning reports on COVID-19 statistics.

In December 2020, Vizzotti headed the Argentine delegation that travelled to Russia to oversee the transportation of 300 thousand Gam-COVID-Vac vaccines developed by the Gamaleya Research Institute of Epidemiology and Microbiology to Argentina.

Minister of Health
Ginés González García resigned from his position as Minister of Health on 19 February 2021, following journalist Horacio Verbitsky's confession that he and others had been favored by González García to receive the COVID-19 vaccine under preferential treatment, in a scandal known as the Vacunatorio VIP ("VIP vaccination room"). As Vice Minister of Health, Vizzotti was touted as the natural successor to González García.

Vizzotti was appointed to the position the following day, on 20 February 2021. Sandra Marcela Tirado was appointed as Secretary of Health Access in Vizzotti's stead.

Personal life
On 26 February 2021, she tested positive for COVID-19 and went into voluntary isolation. On 28 September 2021, she underwent surgery to treat a case of appendicitis.

References

External links

 
 Profile at the website of the Ministry of Health 

1972 births
Living people
Argentine public health doctors
Argentine women physicians
Argentine ministers of health
Women government ministers of Argentina
Physicians from Buenos Aires
Universidad del Salvador alumni
University of Buenos Aires alumni
Women public health doctors